Rhabdochitina is an extinct genus of chitinozoans. It was described by Alfred Eisenack in 1931.

Species
 Rhabdochitina gracilis Eisenack, 1962
 Rhabdochitina magna Eisenack, 1931
 Rhabdochitina sera Nestor, 2007

References

Prehistoric marine animals
Fossil taxa described in 1931